Vlasta Pešková (born 11 April 1938) is a Czech athlete. She competed in the women's javelin throw at the 1960 Summer Olympics.

References

1938 births
Living people
Athletes (track and field) at the 1960 Summer Olympics
Czech female javelin throwers
Olympic athletes of Czechoslovakia
Sportspeople from Příbram